The 2017–18 Eastern Michigan Eagles women's basketball team represents Eastern Michigan University during the 2017–18 NCAA Division I women's basketball season. The Eagles, led by second year head coach Fred Castro, play their home games at the Convocation Center, as members of the West Division of the Mid-American Conference. They finished the season 11–20, 6–12 in MAC play to finish in last place in the West Division. They advance to the quarterfinals of the MAC women's tournament where they lost to Central Michigan.

Roster

Schedule

|-
!colspan=9 style=| Exhibition

|-
!colspan=9 style=| Non-conference regular season

|-
!colspan=9 style=| MAC regular season

|-
!colspan=9 style=| MAC Women's Tournament

References

See also
 2017–18 Eastern Michigan Eagles men's basketball team

Eastern Michigan Eagles women's basketball seasons
Eastern Michigan
Eastern Michigan Eagles women's basketball
Eastern Michigan Eagles women's basketball